The 1960 UC Davis Aggies football team represented the University of California, Davis as a member of the Far Western Conference (FWC) during the 1960 NCAA College Division football season. Led by fifth-year head coach Will Lotter, the Aggies compiled an overall record of 0–8–1 with a mark of 0–5 in conference play, placing last out of six teams in the FWC. The team was outscored by its opponents 216 to 54 for the season. The Aggies played home games at Aggie Field in Davis, California.

The UC Davis sports teams were commonly called the "Cal Aggies" from 1924 until the mid 1970s.

Schedule

Notes

References

UC Davis
UC Davis Aggies football seasons
College football winless seasons
UC Davis Aggies football